Fins to Make Us More Fish-Like is an EP by post-punk band Liars. It was released on July 9, 2002 on Mute Records' subsidiary Blast First, then on November 12 later that year on Mute itself, both as a 10" and as a CD. The first two songs are originals and the third is a more raw version of the opening track of their debut album, They Threw Us All in a Trench and Stuck a Monument on Top.

Track listing
Pillars Were Hollow and Filled With Candy, So We Tore Them Down
Every Day Is a Child With Teeth
Grown Men Don't Fall in the River, Just Like That

References

Liars (band) albums
2002 EPs
Mute Records EPs
Blast First EPs